Aduthathu Albert is a 1985 Indian Tamil-language comedy film produced and directed by G. N. Rangarajan. The film stars Prabhu and Urvashi. It was released on 12 July 1985, and failed at the box office.

Plot 

Albert, a Christian boy, hates Radha, a Brahmin girl. Mary, Albert's sister, and Raja, Radha's brother are in love. Albert then decides to help the lovers but the lovers later commit suicide. Albert and Radha begin to scare their family to teach them a lesson, they eventually fall in love with each other.

Cast 
Prabhu as Albert
Urvashi as Radha
Major Sundarrajan as Krishnamachari
Senthamarai as Alexander, Albert's father
Y. Gee. Mahendra as Basha
Thengai Srinivasan as Raangachari
Isari Velan as Solomon
Charuhasan as Father Daniel
Poornima Bhagyaraj as Paanchali

Soundtrack 
The soundtrack was composed by Ilaiyaraaja, with lyrics written by Vaali, Vairamuthu, Gangai Amaran, Ponnaruvi and Kadhal Mathi. The song "Va Va Mysooru" was adapted from the Kannada song "Aaha Mysore Mallige", composed by Ilaiyaraaja's mentor G. K. Venkatesh.

Reception
Jayamanmadhan of Kalki felt many of the scenes from the film gave an impression of watching an old film in television.

References

External links 

1980s Tamil-language films
1985 films
Films directed by G. N. Rangarajan
Films scored by Ilaiyaraaja
Indian interfaith romance films